Barakatabad (also Romanized as Barakatābād, Barekatābād, and Barkatābād) is a village in Jeyhun Dasht Rural District, Shara District, Hamadan County, Hamadan Province, Iran. At the 2006 census, its population was 131, in 28 families.

References 

Populated places in Hamadan County